WFTU may refer to:

 World Federation of Trade Unions
 WFTU (AM), a radio station (1570 AM) licensed to serve Riverhead, New York, United States